|}

References

Agno
Buildings and structures in Pangasinan